Speedrunning is the act of playing a video game, or section of a video game, with the goal of completing it as fast as possible. Speedrunning often involves following planned routes, which may incorporate sequence breaking and can exploit glitches that allow sections to be skipped or completed more quickly than intended. Tool-assisted speedrunning is a sub-category of speedrunning that uses emulation software to slow the game down and create a precisely controlled sequence of inputs.

Many online communities develop around speedrunning specific games; community leaderboard rankings for individual games form the primary competitive metric for speedrunning. Racing between two or more speedrunners is also a popular form of competition. Videos and livestreams of speedruns are shared via the internet on media sites such as YouTube and Twitch. Speedruns are sometimes showcased at marathon events, which are gaming conventions that feature multiple people performing speedruns in a variety of games.

Methodology

Gameplay strategies 
Routing is considered a fundamental process in speedrunning. Routing is the act of developing an optimal sequence of actions and stages in a video game. A route may involve skipping one or more important items or sections. Skipping a part of a video game that is normally required for progression is referred to as sequence breaking, a term first used in reference to the 2002 action-adventure game Metroid Prime. Video game glitches may be used to achieve sequence breaks, or may be used for other purposes, such as skipping cutscenes and increasing the player's speed or damage output. Some people, called glitch-hunters, choose to focus on finding glitches that will be useful to speedrunners. In some games, arbitrary code execution exploits may be possible, allowing players to write their own code into the game's memory. Several speedruns use a "credits warp," a category of glitch that causes the game's credits sequence to play, which may require arbitrary code execution. The use of glitches and sequence breaks in speedruns was historically not allowed, per the rules of Twin Galaxies' early leaderboards. When speedrunning moved away from Twin Galaxies towards independent online leaderboards, their use became increasingly common.

Tool-assisted speedruns 

A tool-assisted speedrun (TAS) is a speedrun that uses emulation software and tools to create a "theoretically perfect playthrough". According to TASVideos, common examples of tools include advancing the game frame-by-frame to play the game more precisely, retrying parts of the run using savestates, and hex editing. These tools are designed to remove restrictions imposed by human reflexes and allow for optimal gameplay. The run is recorded as a series of controller inputs intended to be fed back to the game in sequence. Although generally recorded on an emulator, TASes can be played back on original console hardware by sending inputs into the console's controller ports. To differentiate them from tool-assisted speedruns, unassisted speedruns are sometimes referred to as real-time attack (RTA) speedruns. Due to the lack of a human playing the game in real time, TASes are not considered to be in competition with RTA speedruns.

Categorization and ranking 
Speedruns are divided into various categories that impose additional limitations on a runner. It is common for category restrictions to require a certain amount of content to be completed in the game. Each video game may have its own speedrun categories, but some categories are popular irrespective of game. The most common are:

 Any%, which involves getting to the end as fast as possible with no qualifiers.
 100%, which requires full completion of a game. This may entail obtaining all items or may use some other metric.
 Low%, the opposite of 100%, which requires the player to beat the game while completing the minimum amount possible.
 Glitchless, which restricts the player from performing any glitches during the speedrun.

Speedrunners compete in these categories by ranking times on online leaderboards. According to Wired, the definitive website for speedrun leaderboards is Speedrun.com.  the site hosts leaderboards for over 20,000 video games. Runners usually record footage of their speedruns for accurate timing and verification, and may include a timer in their videos. They often use timers that keep track of splits—the time between the start of the run and the completion of some section or objective. Verification is usually done by leaderboard moderators who review submissions and determine the validity of individual speedruns.

Community 
According to many speedrunners, community is an important aspect of the hobby. Matt Merkle, director of operations at Games Done Quick, says that speedrunners "value the cooperation the community encourages," and many speedrunners have said that their mental health has improved because of their involvement in the community. Erica Lenti, writing for Wired, says that a sense of community is vital to speedrunning because it motivates players and aids in the development of routes and tricks used in speedruns.

Speedrunners use media sharing sites like YouTube and Twitch to share videos and livestreams of speedruns. The speedrunning community is divided into many sub-communities focused on speedrunning specific games. These sub-communities can form their own independent leaderboards and communicate about their games using Discord. Many communities have used the centralized leaderboard hosting site Speedrun.com since its founding in 2014.

Marathons 

Speedrunning marathons, a form of gaming convention, feature a series of speedruns by multiple speedrunners. While many marathons are held worldwide, the largest event is Games Done Quick, a semiannual marathon held in the United States.  it has raised over $37 million for charity organizations since its inception in 2010. The largest marathon in Europe is the European Speedrunner Assembly, held in Sweden. Both events broadcast the speedruns on Twitch and raise money for various charity organizations. Speedruns at marathons are done in one attempt and often have accompanying commentary. Many people consider marathons to be important to runners and spectators in the speedrunning community. Peter Marsh, writing for the Australian Broadcasting Corporation, says that the Games Done Quick events provide an inclusive space for women and the LGBTQ community in contrast to the related cultures of gaming and Twitch streaming. Alex Miller of Wired says the events have played an important role in connecting people and supporting international humanitarian organization Médecins Sans Frontières during the COVID-19 pandemic.

Speedrun races 
Races between two or more speedrunners are a common competition format. They require players to be skilled at recovering from setbacks during a speedrun because they can not start over. Occasionally, races are featured at marathons; a 4-person Super Metroid race is a popular recurring event at Games Done Quick marathons. The Global Speedrun Association (GSA) have organized head-to-head tournaments for multiple games, including Celeste, Super Mario 64, and Super Mario Odyssey. In 2019, GSA organized an in-person speedrun race event called PACE. Their efforts have drawn criticism from some speedrunners who believe that they "undermine the community spirit", citing cash prizes as incentives to avoid collaboration with other speedrunners and ignore games without prize money. Video game randomizers—ROM hacks that randomly shuffle item locations and other in-game content—are popular for speedrun races as well. Tournaments and other events have been organized for randomizer races, and they have been featured at speedrun marathons.

Cheating

Methods 
Similar to other competitions, there are several methods that players use to try to gain an unfair advantage in speedrunning:

Splicing 
Splicing is by far the most popular cheating method in speedrunning. Here, a speedrun is not recorded continuously, as is usually the case, but instead composed of various video snippets recorded at different times, sometimes with gameplay stolen from TAS composers or legitimate players.

At SGDQ 2019, speedrunner "ConnorAce" used a spliced run to illegitimately claim the world record on Clustertruck for the "NoAbility%" category, depriving the legitimate record holder from being invited to the event. The run was treated with suspicion due to it not being submitted officially to speedrun.com, with the video being unlisted on YouTube prior to ConnorAce's acceptance into SGDQ. In October 2019, ConnorAce's run was exposed by the YouTube documentarian Apollo Legend.

In a typical case, splicing allows difficult segments to be repeated to perfection and edited together afterwards into one seemingly continuous effort, which can sometimes dramatically reduce the amount of time needed to grind out a comparable score. However, a spliced run is not considered cheating if it is announced to be a multi-segment run upon submission; for example, this community-made multi-segment compilation for Super Mario Bros.

TASbotting 
When 'TASbotting', the player records their controller inputs as a tool-assisted run in an external device, in order to then have this device reproduce the inputs on a real console. As with splicing, the inputs of individual segments can be combined and, as is usual for tool-assisted runs, inputs can be made frame by frame. As long as these inputs are authentic and seem realistic for a human being, such manipulations are much more difficult to detect in the resulting video product than splicing. If, on the other hand, a TAS is not outputted on the original hardware but, as usual, on emulators, it can sometimes be alleged from the resulting video that such auxiliary programs were used; additionally, some emulators never perfectly imitate the desired hardware, which can cause synchronization issues when replayed on a console.

Modifying the timer or playback speed 
Modifying game timers, especially on computer games, is another common method to improve one's recorded times. However, this is a very noticeable manipulation, especially in highly competitive areas, since the speedruns in the upper area of leaderboards are repeatedly analyzed by other players in order to check their legitimacy and playback reproducibility, including a temporal check known as "retiming". This often reveals discrepancies between one's recording time and a speedrun in the leaderboards. Another method, a variation of splicing, includes speeding up cutscenes or compressing transitional black space. Again, such methods are likely to be detected by a speedrun moderator, although some games, especially where PC speed can have an effect, may actually vary depending on hardware. Finally, another common cheating method is to play the game in frame by frame or in slow motion, which is similar to normal tool-assisted speedrunning but without the ability to redo inputs. Playing in slow motion is often effective for games that require very precise movements. Prominent games that were affected by this kind of cheating are vast, but prominent examples include Doom and TrackMania.

Modifying in-game files 
While it is often possible to use traditional cheats such as a GameShark to increase character speed, strength, health, etc., such cheats are generally quite easy for an experienced moderator to detect, even when applied subtly. However, the modification of internal files to improve RNG can often be much more difficult to detect. One of the most infamous examples of file modification was several cheated runs by the speedrunner Dream in 2020, whose luck was considered so extreme in a series of Minecraft speedruns that they were considered exceedingly unlikely to have been done without cheating (with an approximately 1 in 20 sextillion chance of occurring, as estimated by Matt Parker from Numberphile) by both the moderators at Speedrun.com and various YouTubers, such as Karl Jobst and Matt Parker, whose videos on Dream gained 4.8 million and 5.6 million views, respectively, as of February 2023. Dream later admitted to the runs being cheated about five months after his runs were rejected, although he claimed he did not know he was using a modified version of the game. Nearly two years later, the player who helped uncover Dream's cheated runs, MinecrAvenger, was also found to be using similar luck manipulation in late 2022.

Cheat detection 
In order to prevent most of these methods, some games require a video of the hands on the controller or keyboard ("handcam"), in addition to the screen recording, so that game-specific moderators in charge of authenticating a submission can ensure that the inputs are really done in the specified combination and by a human. Other methods include forensic audio analysis, which is a common method for detecting telltale signs of video splicing; this is why games without high-quality audio streams are often rejected on speedrun boards. Additional detection methods are the use of mathematics (as in the aforementioned Dream case) or human moderation of suspicious inputs. Because Doom and TrackMania (for instance) use record inputs, suspicious inputs can often be enough to determine that a run was created using slowdown tools, with cheat-detection software in TrackMania being created to analyze over 400,000 replays and isolate a handful of cheaters, in which hundreds of world records were determined to have been cheated using slowdown tools, including Burim "riolu" Fejza, who was signed to the eSports team Nordavind (now known as 00 Nation).

History 

Speedrunning has been generally an intrinsic part of video games since early games, similar to chasing of high scores. However, broad interest in speedrunning came about with the wider availability of the Internet around 1993 that gave the means for players to be able to share their speedruns with online communities. Sites dedicated to speedrunning, including game-specific sites, began to appear at the same time and helped to create the subculture around speedrunning. These sites were not only used for sharing runs but also to collaborate and share tips to improve times, leading to collaborative efforts to continuously improve speedrunning records on certain games.

Earliest examples
The earliest widely distributed speedruns were restricted to games that included an in-game timer such as Dragster, Activision Grand Prix, Excitebike, Metroid II: Return of Samus, and Super Mario Kart. One of the earliest recorded methods of score distribution was via Activision's 1981 newsletter, Activisions, where speedrunners would photograph the time on their screen and submit them to the publication. Such publications would typically put speedruns into a section that also contained highscores or simple completion attempts. This would continue in later publications, including Nintendo Power'''s NES Achievers section, later renamed Power Player's Challenge.

Due to updates being restricted to the publication's interval, records could stand for months before any successful challenge could be widely known. Furthermore, photographing a CRT television incorrectly could result in times being lost or misread, and there were no means of community verification. Information on how these runs were achieved were only rarely disclosed. Finally, proof of these runs can be lost by the publisher, which happened with Todd Rogers' debunked 5.51 second run of Dragster.

 Doom and Quake demos, early Internet communities 
Although speedruns were being done before the 1990s, the development of a speedrunning community is considered to have originated with the 1993 computer game Doom. The game included a feature that allowed players to record and play back gameplay using files called demos (also known as game replays). Demos were lightweight files that could be shared more easily than video files on Internet bulletin board systems at the time. In January 1994, University of Waterloo student Christina Norman created a File Transfer Protocol server dedicated to compiling demos, named the LMP Hall of Fame (after the .lmp file extension used by Doom demos). The LMP Hall of Fame inspired the creation of the Doom Honorific Titles by Frank Stajano, a catalogue of titles that a player could obtain by beating certain challenges in the game. The Doom speedrunning community emerged in November 1994, when Simon Widlake created COMPET-N, a website hosting leaderboards dedicated to ranking completion times of Doom's single-player levels.In 1996, id Software released Quake as a successor to the Doom series. Like its predecessor, Quake had a demo recording feature and drew attention from speedrunners. In April 1997, Nolan "Radix" Pflug created Nightmare Speed Demos (NSD), a website for tracking Quake speedruns. In June 1997, Pflug released a full-game speedrun demo of Quake called Quake done Quick, which introduced speedrunning to a broader audience. Quake speedruns were notable for their breadth of movement techniques, including "bunny hopping," a method of gaining speed also present in future shooting games like Counter-Strike and Team Fortress. In April 1998, NSD merged with another demo-hosting website to create Speed Demos Archive.

 Speed Demos Archive and video sharing 
For five years, Speed Demos Archive hosted exclusively Quake speedruns, but in 2003 it published a 100% speedrun of Metroid Prime done by Pflug. Six months later, SDA began accepting runs from all games. Unlike its predecessor websites, SDA did not compile leaderboards for their games; they displayed only the fastest speedrun of each game. Until SDA's expansion into games other than Quake in 2004, speedrun video submissions were primarily sent to early video game record-keeper Twin Galaxies. The videos were often never publicly released, creating verifiability concerns that SDA aimed to address. It was often impossible to determine what strategies had gone into setting these records, hindering the development of speedrunning techniques.

In 2003, a video demonstrating a TAS of Super Mario Bros. 3 garnered widespread attention on the internet; many speedrunners cite this as their first introduction to the hobby. It was performed and published by a Japanese user named Morimoto. The video was lacking context to indicate that it was a TAS, so many people believed it to be an actual human performance. It drew criticism from viewers who felt "cheated" when Morimoto later explained the process by which he created the video and apologized for the confusion. In December 2003, after seeing Morimoto’s TAS, a user named Bisqwit created TASVideos (initially named NESVideos), a site dedicated to displaying tool-assisted speedruns.

The creation of video sharing and streaming websites in the late 2000s and early 2010s contributed to an increase in accessibility and popularity of speedrunning. In 2005, the creation of YouTube enabled speedrunners to upload and share videos of speedruns and discuss strategies on the SDA forums. Twitch, a livestreaming website centered around video gaming, was launched in 2011. The advent of livestreaming made for easier verification and preservation of speedruns, and some speedrunners believe it is responsible for a shift towards collaboration among members of the community. In 2014, Speedrun.com was created, which had less stringent submission guidelines than SDA and was intended to centralize speedrun leaderboards for many different games. Speedrunners' move towards using Speedrun.com'' and social media platforms like Skype and Discord contributed to SDA's relevance waning in the 2010s.

See also 
Donkey Kong high score competition
List of video games notable for speedrunning
Time attack

References

External links 

 Karl Jobst: The Evolution Of Speedrunning (Video essay on YouTube)
 Speedrun.com, popular leaderboard-hosting website

 
Video game gameplay
Articles containing video clips
Emergent gameplay
1990s neologisms